Space Base Delta 3 (SBD 3) is a United States Space Force unit assigned to the Space Systems Command. The unit is stationed at Los Angeles Air Force Base, California. It is the successor to the 61st Air Base Group of the United States Air Force and the Los Angeles Garrison, which existed through the first two years of the Space Force. The garrison operates Los Angeles Air Force Base and supports Space Systems Command.

The origins date to World War II where the 61st Troop Carrier Group was a Douglas C-47 Skytrain transport unit assigned to both Twelfth and Ninth Air Forces in North Africa, Italy and Western Europe. The 61 TCG was highly decorated for its combat parachute infantry drops during the Invasion of Sicily (Operation Husky); Invasion of Italy (Operation Avalanche); Invasion of France (Operation Overlord); the airborne invasion of the Netherlands (Operation Market-Garden); and the airborne crossing of the Rhine River, (Operation Varsity).

History
 For additional history and lineage, see 61st Air Base Wing
The group was established before the Attack on Pearl Harbor, in December 1940, with Douglas C-47 Skytrain transport aircraft. It initially trained under I Troop Carrier Command in the southeast United States. Trained in paratroop missions and glider towing, it was deployed to the Mediterranean Theater of Operations (MTO) and flew combat missions in the North African and Tunisian Campaigns under Twelfth Air Force.

It flew airborne assault and resupply airdrop missions during the invasions of Sicily and Italy in 1943 and transported cargo and personnel throughout the North African and Mediterranean theaters.

Reassigned to Ninth Air Force and was moved to England in the European Theater of Operations (ETO).
Flew airborne assault missions during the Normandy invasion and later supported Operation Market Garden in the Netherlands. In 1945 it participated in the airborne assault across the Rhine. Also provided transport services in the European theater, hauling gasoline, ammunition, food, medicine, and other supplies, and evacuating wounded personnel.

Moved to Trinidad in May 1945. Assigned to Air Transport Command. Used C-47's to transport troops returning to the US. Inactivated in Trinidad on 31 July 1945

Cold War
It was reactivated in Germany on 30 September 1946. Assigned to United States Air Forces in Europe. Redesignated 61st Troop Carrier Group (Medium) in July 1948, and 61st Troop Carrier Group (Heavy) in August 1948. In Germany, the group participated in the Berlin Airlift, from June 1948 to May 1949, the group's C-54 aircraft ferried coal, flour, and other cargo into Berlin.

In 1950, the group moved to the United States shortly after the outbreak of the Korean War for duty with Military Air Transport Service. Attached to Far East Air Forces, it flew airlift missions on the Northern Pacific Route from the United States to Japan in support of UN forces in Korea before moving to Japan and conducting airlift missions from Japan to Korea from 1950–1952.

Returned to the US in November 1952 to join Tactical Air Command, to which the group had been assigned in October 1951. Converted from C-54 to C-124 aircraft and carried out worldwide strategic airlift operations from 1952–1959. Inactivated on 8 October 1959.

The 61st Military Airlift Group was reactivated at Howard Air Force Base, Panama on 1 December 1984. At Howard, the group was the parent unit for the 310th Military Airlift Squadron (310th MAS) with a diverse array of aircraft (C-21A, CT-43A, C-130E/H, C-27A). The C-21 and CT-43 provided VIP airlift support for the Commander-In-Chief, U.S. Southern Command (CINCSOUTH). The C-130s and C-27s flew tactical airlift operations in Central and South America from 1984–1992. The unit was inactivated and its assets absorbed by the 24th Wing when the 310th's mission was transferred to Air Combat Command on 1 June 1992.

Base support
The 61st Air Base Group operated Los Angeles Air Force Base and supported the Space and Missile Systems Center since 1994, the now-Space Base Delta 3 continues to do the same for the successor to SSC, Space Systems Command.

Lineage
 Established as 61st Transport Group on 20 November 1940
 Activated on 1 December 1940
 Redesignated 61st Troop Carrier Group on 4 July 1942
 Inactivated on 31 July 1945
 Activated on 30 September 1946
 Redesignated: 61st Troop Carrier Group, Medium, on 1 July 1948
 Redesignated: 61st Troop Carrier Group, Heavy, on 15 August 1948
 Inactivated on 8 October 1959
 Redesignated 61st Military Airlift Group, and activated, on 1 December 1984
 Inactivated on 1 June 1992
 Redesignated 61st Air Base Group on 16 September 1994
 Activated on 1 October 1994
 Redesignated 61st Mission Support Group on 1 August 2006
 Redesignated 61st Air Base Group on 30 July 2010
 Redesignated Space Base Delta 3 on 14 July 2022

Assignments

 Unknown, 1 December 1940 – 31 March 1942
 50th Transport Wing, 31 March 1942
 51st Transport Wing (later 51st Troop Carrier Wing), 1 June 1942
 52d Troop Carrier Wing, 6 August 1942
 50th Troop Carrier Wing, 12 October 1942
 53d Troop Carrier Wing, 3 November 1942
 52d Troop Carrier Wing, 15 February 1943
 Air Transport Command, 7 May 1945
 Attached to Caribbean Division, Air Transport Command, 29 May – 31 July 1945
 51st Troop Carrier Wing (known as European Air Transport Service, Provisional), 30 September 1946
 United States Air Forces in Europe, 20 December 1947
 61st Troop Carrier Wing, 1 July 1948
 Attached to: 1st Airlift Task Force, 5–26 November 1948
 Attached to: Airlift Wing [Provisional], 26 November 1948 – 20 January 1949
 Attached to: 7497th Airlift Wing, 20 January – 10 July 1949
 Attached to: Military Air Transport Service, 21–26 July 1950
 Attached to: North Pacific Air Transport Wing, Provisional, 26 July – 24 August 1950
 Attached to: 1705th Air Transport Wing, 24 August – 10 December 1950
 Attached to: Far East Air Force Combat Cargo Command, Provisional, 10 December 1950 – 1 January 1951

 1705th Air Transport Wing, 1 January 1951
 Attached to: Far East Air Forces Combat Cargo Command, Provisional, 1–25 January 1951
 Attached to: 315th Air Division, 25 January – 1 October 1951
 Eighteenth Air Force, 1 October 1951
 Attached to: 315th Air Division, 1 October – 5 November 1951
 Attached to: 6122 Air Base Wing, 5 November 1951 – 26 March 1952
 Attached to: 374th Troop Carrier Wing, 26 March – 21 November 1952
 Attached to: 62d Troop Carrier Wing, 21 November 1952 – 25 August 1954
 Attached to: 63d Troop Carrier Wing, 25 August 1954 – 1 July 1957
 63d Troop Carrier Wing, 1 July 1957 – 8 October 1959
 Twenty-First Air Force, 1 December 1984 – 1 June 1992
 Space and Missile Systems Center, 1 October 1994
 61st Air Base Wing, 1 August 2006
 Space and Missile Systems Center, 30 July 2010 – present

Components
 4th Troop Carrier Squadron: attached 10 December 1950 – 24 July 1951
 12th Troop Carrier Squadron: attached 30 September – 15 October 1946
 13th Transport (later, 13th Troop Carrier) Squadron: 1 December 1940-c. 10 October 1942
 14th Transport (later, 14th Troop Carrier) Squadron: 4 December 1940 – 31 July 1945; 30 September 1946 – 8 October 1959 (detached c. 5 December 1950 – 26 March 1952; 21 November – 1 December 1952; August 1956 – March 1957; August-8 October 1959)
 15th Transport (later, 15th Troop Carrier) Squadron: 4 December 1940 – 31 July 1945; 30 September 1946 – 8 October 1959 (detached February–August 1957)
 53d Transport (later, 53d Troop Carrier) Squadron: 1 June 1942 – 31 July 1945; 30 September 1946 – 8 October 1959 (detached 26 March – 14 September 1952; September 1958-c. March 1959)
 59th Troop Carrier Squadron: 23 October 1942 – 31 July 1945
 310th Military Airlift Squadron: 1 December 1984 – 1 June 1992.

Stations

 Olmsted Field, Pennsylvania, 1 December 1940
 Daniel Field, Georgia, 9 July 1941
 Pope Field, North Carolina, 26 May 1942
 Lubbock Army Air Field, Texas, 23 September 1942
 Pope Field, North Carolina, 26 February 1943 – 4 May 1943
 Lourmel Airfield, Morocco, 15 May 1943
 Kairouan Airfield, Tunisia, 21 June 1943
 Licata Airfield, Sicily, Italy, 1 September 1943
 Sciacca Airfield, Sicily, Italy, 6 October 1943
 RAF Barkston Heath (AAF-483), England, 18 February 1944
 Abbeville/Drucat Airfield (B-92), France, 13 March – 19 May 1945

 Waller Field, Trinidad, 29 May – 31 July 1945
 Eschborn Airfield, Germany, 30 September 1946
 Rhein-Main Air Base, Germany, 11 February 1947 – 21 July 1950
 McChord Air Force Base, Washington, 26 July – 5 December 1950
 Ashiya Air Base, Japan, 10 December 1950
 Tachikawa Air Base, Japan, 26 March – 15 November 1952
 Larson Air Force Base, Washington, 21 November 1952
 Donaldson Air Force Base, South Carolina, 25 August 1954 – 8 October 1959
 Howard Air Force Base, Panama, 1 December 1984 – 1 June 1992
 Los Angeles Air Force Base, California, 1 October 1994 – present

Aircraft
 C-47 Skytrain, 1942–1945; 1946–1948
 CG-4 Waco (Glider), 1942–1945
 C-54 Skymaster, 1948–1952
 C-124 Globemaster, 1952–1959
 C-130 Hercules, 1984–1992.
 C-22A (Boeing 727-30), 1985-1990

List of commanders

 Col Andrew Jasinski, 1 October 1994 – 8 September 1995
 Col Gilbert A. Engel, 8 September 1995 – 12 September 1997
 Col Dieter V. Barnes, 12 September 1997 – 18 June 1999
 Col David E. Price, 18 June 1999 – 26 September 2000
 Col Phil W. Parker, 26 September 2000 – 27 September 2002
 Col Brian E. Kistner, 27 September 2002 – 11 May 2004
 Col Carl E. Brazelton, 11 May 2004 – 21 July 2004
 Col Joseph M. Codispoti, 21 July 2004 – 

 Col Anita Latin
 Col Frank W. Simcox, August 2010
 Col Sam McNiel, 29 June 2012
 Col Donna Turner

References

 
 Johnson, David C. (1988), U.S. Army Air Forces Continental Airfields (ETO), D-Day to V-E Day; Research Division, USAF Historical Research Center, Maxwell AFB, Alabama.

Air base groups of the United States Air Force
Deltas of the United States Space Force
Military units and formations established in 1994